College Street may refer to:
College Street (Kolkata)
College Street (Toronto)
College Street (Sydney)
College Street (York)
College Street (Dublin), a road in Dublin City Centre

Odonyms referring to a building